Chateau Rhianfa is a Grade II*-listed former house which has been converted into a hotel. Its gardens are  listed as Grade II* on the Cadw/ICOMOS Register of Parks and Gardens of Special Historic Interest in Wales.

History 
Located in Beaumaris on the Island of Anglesey, the estate on which Chateau Rhianfa sits was originally given to Sir John Williams, 1st Baronet of Bodelwyddan in 1828 by his parents. Construction work began on the House of Rhianfa (also known as Plas Rhianfa) in the spring of 1849 by Sir John Williams, 2nd Baronet of Bodelwyddan. Originally the house was intended to provide a residence for William's wife and daughters in the event of his death. The house was completed two years later in 1851. The house remained in the possession of the Williams family until 1957 when it was sold and converted into a number of apartments. Most of the land surrounding the house was also sold, leaving three acres attached to the estate.

In 2012 the building reopened as a hotel, with three cottages within the estate converted into guest houses. Chateau Rhianfa has been awarded a 5 star guest accommodation grading from Visit Wales and a Visit Wales Gold Award.
Chateau Rhianfa was also winner of the 2012 Quality Regeneration Tourism Award from the Anglesey Tourism Awards.

Architectural style 
The Williams family had travelled extensively in the Loire region of France and drew inspiration for their home from the chateaux they observed there. Lady Sarah Williams was said to be particularly fond of the architectural style popularised by King Francois I. Chateau Rhianfa’s architecture draws on the châteaux of Blois, Chambord, Amboise, Chenonceau and Chaumont. The house is a Grade II* listed building, and its gardens are listed at Grade II on the Cadw/ICOMOS Register of Parks and Gardens of Special Historic Interest in Wales.

References

External links
 

Grade_II*_listed_buildings_in_Anglesey
Registered historic parks and gardens in Anglesey
Hotels in Anglesey
Country houses in Anglesey